The Lotteries Act 1710 (9 Ann c 6) was an Act of the Parliament of Great Britain. As enacted, it specified duties on exports of certain commodities, coal, and candles and regulated the state lottery. Section 57, the last to be repealed, reinforced the Suppression of Lotteries Act 1698 and specified a £100 fine for offenders, to be distributed one third each to the Crown, the parish poor, and the informant.

Section 14 in Ruffhead's Edition corresponds to sections 14 and 15 in The Statutes of the Realm, and later section numbers are consequently one less in Ruffhead.

The penalties specified in the act for unauthorised lotteries were extended to the Kingdom of Ireland in 1756.

Some of the duties ceased automatically after 32 years; others were ceased by various acts from 1784 onwards. The 1710 act's provisions regulating the state lottery were amended by later acts until it was finally abolished under the Lotteries Act 1823.

All sections of the act except section 57 were repealed by the Statute Law Revision Act 1867.

The portions of the long title describing the provisions repealed in 1867 were deleted by the Statute Law Revision Act 1887.

The whole Act was repealed in Great Britain by the Betting and Lotteries Act 1934, in Northern Ireland by the Betting and Lotteries Act (Northern Ireland) 1957, and in the Republic of Ireland by the Gaming and Lotteries Act 1956.

Notes

References

Sources
 Halsbury's Statutes

Candles
Coal in the United Kingdom
Customs duties
Great Britain Acts of Parliament 1710
Lotteries in the United Kingdom
Repealed Great Britain Acts of Parliament
Tax legislation in the United Kingdom
Gambling legislation in the United Kingdom